Albadraco is an azhdarchid pterosaur genus that during the Late Cretaceous lived in the area of modern Romania. The type species is Albadraco tharmisensis.

Discovery and naming
At the site of Oarda de Jos, near Alba Iulia in Alba County, two jaw pieces were found of a large pterosaur. The discovery was reported and illustrated in a dissertation by Cătălin Jipa-Murzea in 2012.

In 2019, the type species Albadraco tharmisensis was named and described by Alexandru Adrian Solomon, Vlad Aurel Codrea, Márton Venczel and Gerald Grellet-Tinner. The generic name combines a reference to Alba with the Latin draco, "dragon". The specific name refers to a provenance near Tharmis, the ancient Dacian name of Alba Iulia.

The holotype, PSMUBB V651a, b, was found in a layer of the Șard Formation dating from the latest Maastrichtian, sixty-six million years old. It consists of two fused premaxillae of the snout (PSMUBB V651a) and a piece of the symphysis of the lower jaws (PSMUBB V651b). Both parts were assumed to have belonged to a single individual, perhaps a subadult animal. It is the first example from the Cretaceous of Europe of a pterosaur exemplar preserving both upper jaw and lower jaw elements.

A second specimen, PSMUBB V652, a fourth neck vertebra from the same site, was referred to the species. It too is from a subadult animal and the describing authors considered it possible that it represented the same individual as the holotype.

Description
The wingspan of the holotype was estimated at five to six metres, by extrapolation from the jaw pieces. The adult size was estimated at a span of six to seven metres. Albadraco shared its habitat with Hatzegopteryx and the possibility was considered that its holotype was only a juvenile exemplar of that giant pterosaur. This was deemed improbable however, because the holotype bone structure resembled that of subadult animals, not of fast growing young individuals.

The describing authors indicated five distinguishing traits. They were autapomorphies, unique derived characters, in which Albadraco differs from all other known Azhdarchidae. The cutting edges and sides of the beak show a high foramina density. The premaxilla has split-like foramina on the lower and side surfaces but also two rows of foramina on the side. The snout has a triangular cross-section but its top edge is more rounded than with other azhdarchids. The symphysis of the lower jaws has a U-shaped cross-section in front but a V-shaped one at the rear. The fourth neck vertebra has an Elongation Ratio, horizontal length divided by transverse width, that more approaches the ER of the third neck vertebra of other azhdarchids in being shorter than usual.

Phylogeny
In 2019, Albadraco was placed in the Azhdarchidae, based on the comparative method.

See also

 Timeline of pterosaur research

References

Azhdarchids
Late Cretaceous pterosaurs of Europe
Fossil taxa described in 2019